Ziering is a surname. Notable people with the surname include:

Amy Ziering (born 1962), film producer and director
Bob Ziering, illustrator
Ian Ziering (born 1964), American actor
Marilyn Ziering, American business executive and philanthropist
Nikki Ziering (born 1971), American model and actress
Sigi Ziering (1928–2000), German-born American business executive, playwright and philanthropist